Joseph Mark Maksymiw (born 20 September 1995) is a professional rugby union player from England. He primarily plays as a lock. Maksymiw currently plays for Welsh regional side Dragons in the Pro14, having joined from Irish provincial side Connacht in 2020.

Born in Derby, Maksymiw attended De Lisle College in Loughborough.  He started playing rugby at age 15 and at 16 was picked up by the Leicester Tigers academy. 

Maksymiw made his Leicester debut on 4 November 2014 when he came on as a replacement against the Barbarians at Welford Road. After playing in the Anglo-Welsh Cup, he made his Premiership Rugby debut on 16 September 2017 against Gloucester. He made a total of 12 appearances before leaving the side at the end of the 2017–18 season. On 15 May 2018, Irish side Connacht announced that Maksymiw would be joining them side that summer.

On 1 July 2020, it was announced that Maksymiw had signed a long-term contract with Welsh regional side Dragons

Maksymiw was part of England under 18's tour to South Africa in 2014. He is a fan of Leicester City F.C.

References

1995 births
Living people
Dragons RFC players
Connacht Rugby players
English rugby union players
Leicester Tigers players
Rugby union locks
Rugby union players from Derby
Doncaster Knights players